Wellington High School is a public school located in Wellington, Florida, in central Palm Beach County.

Curriculum

English 
Four Credits of English are required. English 1 is offered all the way up to English 4, with the addition of AICE General Papers for 9th graders, AICE Language and Composition for 10th graders, AICE Literature and Composition AS Level for 11th graders and AICE Literature and Composition A Level for 12th graders. Dual Enrollment is now offered as well.

Social Studies 
One credit of World History, one credit of U.S. History, 0.5 credits of Economics, and 0.5 credits of Government are required to graduate. Geography is optional during freshman year, World History is taken during sophomore year, U.S. History during junior year, and Economics and Government is taken during senior year, one semester each.

Math 
Four Credits of Math are required to graduate.  Algebra 1, Geometry, Algebra II, AICE Math, Math College Readiness, Pre-Calculus, 
Calculus, AP Calculus (AB and BC), Trigonometry, and AP Statistics are offered.

Science 
Three Credits of Science are needed to graduate. Integrated Science (formerly known as Earth Sciences), Biology, Chemistry, Anatomy, Physics, Zoology, Marine Biology, Environmental Science, and the Veterinary Academy are all offered, and in the 2010–2011 school year, Forensic Science will be offered.

Foreign Languages 
Foreign Language is required to graduate from high school. You need one foreign language credit to graduate, At least two credits are required for college acceptance. Spanish and French are both offered from Spanish and French 1 up to AP Spanish and French. American Sign Language is also offered. American Sign Language offers from ASL 1 to ASL 4.

Magnet Programs 
The Veterinary, marketing, fine arts, and fire academy are offered as magnet programs at WHS. There are two science labs and a long distance communications lab

Extra curricular programs

Debate 
The debate team has had much success in regional and even national competition. The team is under the direction of Paul Gaba, who took over the Wellington program in 2002. Since then, Wellington has qualified 17 students to six National Forensic League national championship tournaments, including advanced rounds in Public Forum Debate and Congressional Debate.

Sports 
The girls' lacrosse team won state championships in 2002 and 2004. The girls' soccer team were the state champions in the 2007–2008 school year. There are also a full complement of team sports, including football, soccer, tennis, swimming, bowling, basketball, baseball, track, volleyball, golf, and lacrosse.

The 2008–2009 boys' varsity soccer team was ranked 2nd in the country by Adidas and 4th overall by Rise Magazine.

Track star Ashley Brasovan graduated in 2009. She was ranked number one in the country by Rise Magazine and attended Duke University.

Competitive cheer 

In 2016 at FHSAA they took 2nd place and 2022 ,in 2017 they won 1st place in FHSAA in the nun tumbling medium Division they was NHSCC runners up in 2016 and in 2018 they won NHSCC in 2015 and 2019 they also won FHSAA regionals in 2017,2018,2019 and in 2020.

Varsity football 
2009–2010: The  team under coach Chris Romano went 5–5. The football team beat Forest Hill during homecoming 2009.  The Wolverines eventually would get into the playoffs and lose to Blanche-Ely 49–3.

2010–2011: The varsity football team under Coach Romano went 5–5 winning the first district title since 2001.  The Wolverines played the Boyd Anderson cobras in the first round of the playoffs, but lost 21–12

2014-2015: The varsity football team under Coach Tom Abel went 9-1 and beat Park Vista in the first round of the state playoffs 53-29. They beat Palm Beach Gardens 16-10 in the regional semifinals, but lost in the Regional Finals to Flanagan 32-0.

Junior wide receiver Ahmmon Richards had 56 receptions for 1,318 receiving yards and 23 touchdowns in 2014-15

2015-2016: The varsity football team under coach Tom Abel went 6-4 and made the state playoffs but lost in the first round 34-0 to Atlantic.

In 2021 Danny Mendoza took over the Wolverines and is on his way to leading them to a winning season for the first year in 3 years.

Band 
The Mighty Wolverine Sound Marching Band  has over 150 participants. The band is directed by Mary S. Oser.

Notable alumni 

John Brebbia (Class of 2008), MLB pitcher for the San Francisco Giants
Sean Burnett (Class of 2000), retired MLB pitcher
Brooke Eden (Class of 2007), country music singer and songwriter.
Arin Hanson (Class of 2005; did not graduate), animator, internet personality, comedian, and musician
Tyler Herron (Class of 2005), baseball player
Cassadee Pope (Class of 2008), country music singer-songwriter 
Vanessa Rousso (Class of 2001), professional poker player and cast member on Big Brother 17
Nick Zano (Class of 1997), actor and producer
Ahmmon Richards (Class of 2016), former Miami Hurricanes Wide-Receiver
Jerry Lorenzo (Class of 1995), creator of Fear of God Clothing Line
Mark Brownson (Class of 1993), retired MLB pitcher
Trent Frazier (Class of 2017), Guard for the Illinois Fighting Illini

References

External links 
 Wellington Community High School Main Site
 Wellington High School Marching Band Main Page
 Wellington High School Debate Main Page

High schools in Palm Beach County, Florida
Public high schools in Florida
Wellington, Florida
Educational institutions established in 1988
1988 establishments in Florida